ESCAPPM or ESCHAPPM is a mnemonic for the organisms with inducible beta-lactamase activity that is chromosomally mediated.

E: Enterobacter spp.
S: Serratia spp.
C: Citrobacter freundii
H: Hafnia spp.
A: Aeromonas spp.
P: Proteus spp. (excluding P. mirabilis)
P: Providencia spp.
M: Morganella morganii

In vitro sensitivities are not applicable in vivo.

In general, treatment with cephalosporins results in inducible beta-lactamase activity. Treatment with an aminoglycoside or carbapenem is usually indicated. Carbapenems are a class of beta-lactam antibiotics with a broad spectrum of antibacterial activity. They have a structure that renders them highly resistant to beta-lactamases. Examples of carbapenems include meropenem and imipenem.

References

Science mnemonics